Edith Brown may refer to:

 Dame Edith Mary Brown (1864–1956), British medical missionary to India
 Edith Haisman, née Edith Eileen Brown (1896–1997), Titanic survivor
 Edith Charlotte Brown, aka Mrs Francis Brown (1876–1945), English novelist and great-niece of Jane Austen